Thamanin, also spelled Themanin, was a town located to the south of Mount Judi in southeast Turkey. Muslims and other people believe that Mount Judi is the resting place of the Ark of Nuh or Noah.

Historical significance 
Since at least 697 B.C.E., it was often held that after the ark came to rest on the mountain, Noah and the survivors of the flood (who were thought to have numbered 80) came down from it, and built this town to the south of the mountain, hence the name of Thamanin or Themanin, meaning "Eighty". In his commentary about the Quran (11:4; the verse that mentions the landing of Noah's ark upon Al-Judiy), the English Orientalist George Sale said:

Geography 

Located east of Cizre (formerly "Jazirat ibn `Umar", at the headwaters of the Tigris River, near the modern border with Syria, and that of Iraq), southeast of Şah (Çağlayan), and northwest of the Iraqi city of Zakho, Compton visited the tel in 2013, and reckoned that this was the most likely location of Thamanin. It is worth mentioning that Cizre is one of the places that is thought to have the tomb of Noah.

See also 
 The city of Nakhchivan
 Corduene
 Karaca Dağ near Diyarbakır
 Nusaybin
 Searches for Noah's Ark

References 

Archaeological sites in Southeastern Anatolia
Noah
Ruins in Turkey
Şırnak Province